Tongfu may refer to:
 Olyphant & Co., was a merchant trading house or hong in 19th-century China
 Tongfu, Tongxiang (同福乡), a township in Zhejiang province, China
Tongfu（同夫, see tongqi）,  a neologism for men who have married lesbian women